Chris Spice  (born 25 December 1959) is a British-Australian sports executive, currently Performance Director for British Swimming, and a former field hockey player for Australia.

Early life
He was born in Brisbane, the last of six children. People in his family played top-tier sport.

He played field hockey for Queensland and Australia.

Career

Field hockey
In the early 1990s he became a coach for the Australian women's field hockey team, working under Ric Charlesworth. The team won the World Cup in 1994 and the Olympic gold medal in 1996.

After the Olympics he became Performance Director for the English Hockey Association (England Hockey) in 1997, and joined the Great Britain team in 1998, taking the teams to the Olympics in 2000, where the men finished sixth and the women finished eighth.

Basketball
In 2007 he became Performance Director for British Basketball, being responsible for the team at the 2012 Summer Olympics.

Swimming
He became the Performance Director for British Swimming, taking the team to the Olympics in 2016 and 2021.

Spice was appointed Officer of the Order of the British Empire (OBE) in the 2022 New Year Honours for services to swimming and high performance sport.

See also
 Bill Furniss, head coach of British Swimming
 Hockey Queensland
 Simon Timson, former Performance Director of UK Sport

References

External links
 British Swimming profile

1959 births
Australian basketball coaches
Australian field hockey coaches
Australian swimming coaches
Field hockey people from Queensland
Sportspeople from Brisbane
Swimming in the United Kingdom
Living people
Australian emigrants to the United Kingdom
Officers of the Order of the British Empire